Tolga Örnek (born 25 August 1972) is a Turkish film director, writer and producer who, in recognition of his 2005 documentary, Gallipoli, was awarded an honorary medal in the general division of the Order of Australia.[1]

He studied at the Robert College and later at the Istanbul Technical University. He received his MS in engineering from the University of Florida and his MA in Film and Video Production from American University. Since his Gallipoli documentary, he's moved into feature films by producing, directing and writing four feature films. He is also the director of Losers' Club, which is one of the highest grossing Turkish films ever produced. His film, Labyrinth, an action thriller, has received wide international acclaim and has been distributed worldwide.

Filmography
 Atatürk (1998)
 Kuruluştan Kurtuluşa Fenerbahçe (1999)
 Topkapı Sarayı (1999)
 Tanrıların Tahtı Nemrut Dağı (2000)
 Çeliğin Kalbi Ereğli (2001)
 Gallipoli (Gelibolu) (2005)
 Hittites (2003)
 Devrim Arabaları (2008)
 Losers' Club (2011)
Labyrinth (2011)
Your Story (2013)
Sen Benim HerSeyimsin (2016)

References

External links
 
 An interview with Tolga Ornëk, director of Gallipoli: The Front Line Experience 20 December 2005 with Richard Phillips on the World Socialist Web Site

Turkish film directors
Turkish film producers
1972 births
Living people
Robert College alumni
Istanbul Technical University alumni
Place of birth missing (living people)
Honorary Recipients of the Medal of the Order of Australia